Eero Ritala (born 30 March 1983) is a Finnish actor.

Career

After graduating from Theatre Academy Helsinki in 2008, Ritala has been seen on stage, in films and on television. He is best known for having appeared in the first season of the sketch comedy television show Putous and for his performance in a 2012 film Kulman pojat which earned him a Jussi Award for Best Actor in a Leading Role. He is also occasionally DJing under the pseudonym DJ Vauvaukki.

Private life

Ritala is cohabiting with an actress Lotta Kaihua. The two appeared together in Kulman pojat.

Selected filmography

In films
Lasileuka (2004)
Onni von Sopanen (2006)
Veijarit (2010)
Fanatics (2012)
21 tapaa pilata avioliitto (2013)
Armi elää! (2015)

On television
Enon varjo (1999)
Akkaa päälle (2006)
Uutishuone (2009)
Ihmebantu (2009)
Putous (2010)
Tauno Tukevan sota (2010)
Klikkaa mua (2011)
Vino show (2014–present)
Tripla (2015)

References

External links

21st-century Finnish male actors
Finnish male film actors
1983 births
Finnish male television actors
Living people